Fiat 1500  may refer to:
 Fiat 1500 (1935), the 1935 model
 Fiat 1300 and 1500, the 1961 model